Brock Hill is a hamlet in Berkshire, England, within the civil parish of Warfield.

External links
 

Hamlets in Berkshire
Warfield